Women with disabilities have the same health issues as any other women, such as the need for routine breast and cervical cancer screening. Women with impaired mobility are often not given basic tests, such as weight monitoring, due to the lack of accessible equipment.

Women with disabilities, especially individuals who belong to minority groups or who live in rural settings, are often underserved in their healthcare needs. In addition, women with disabilities are more likely to live in poverty, which puts them at a greater health risk. In general, because of a lack of social connectedness that many disabled women experience, they often become disconnected from sources of support which can include healthcare providers. In Brazil, women with disabilities are also less likely to seek out gynecological health care, due to various reasons, including cultural attitudes and cost.

Article 12 of the United Nations Convention on the Elimination of All Forms of Discrimination against Women outlines women's protection from gender discrimination when receiving health services and women's entitlement to specific gender-related healthcare provisions. Article 25 of the Convention on the Rights of Persons with Disabilities specifies that "persons with disabilities have the right to the enjoyment of the highest attainable standard of health without discrimination on the basis of disability."

Because traditionally, men have been used to model and test health treatments, approaches to health services, such as physical therapy, have not been properly aligned with disabled women's needs. It wasn't until after the 1990s that women's health issues were studied in-depth in the United States. In addition, researching the health issues of women with disabilities is also understudied. Starting in the early 2000s, health issues for people with disabilities began to be studied in the United States. The first long-term study involving the experiences of women with disability and gynecological services was published in 2001.

When disabled women need to access routine services for anything other than their main impairment(s), they can be perceived as "problematic patients" by healthcare providers. Women with disabilities have reported that they are seen through the lens of their disability first, and as a person second, by healthcare providers. One woman with cerebral palsy reported that it was perceived by her doctor that every health concern was because of her CP, including a toothache. Conversely, a 2003 report  found that not only did health care providers in general have positive attitudes towards people with physical disabilities in Saudi Arabia, regardless of gender and which cited that most health care professionals worldwide have positive attitudes.

In countries with strict gender segregation, such as Saudi Arabia, women must use women-only clinics, many of which do not have access for people with physical disabilities.

Sexual health and contraception
Women, including young women with disabilities, use contraceptives for various reasons. These include for prevention of pregnancy, menstrual suppression or because of the use of teratogenic medications. Women with intellectual disabilities (ID) are more likely to use contraceptives or even to request a hysterectomy in order to manage menstruation. Various types of contraception are available to women with disabilities, however, prescription of a specific type of birth control largely rests on the kind of disability a woman has and the types of associated side-effects of the method of contraception.

Menstrual cycles are sometimes affected by different types of disabilities. In addition, women who become disabled later in life sometimes experience transient menstrual disorders.

Healthcare professionals are less likely to refer women with disabilities for various gynecological screenings. This is an attitudinal barrier which can come from a healthcare provider's unfamiliarity with disability or because they assume women with disabilities are asexual in nature. Women with disabilities are less likely than women without disabilities to receive recommended Pap smears. Women who have a spinal cord injury above the T6 vertebra can have autonomic dysreflexia during a pelvic exam which can be life-threatening. Women with ID are less likely to be given Pap smears because the process itself may be upsetting to the patient.

Women with physical disabilities may be unable to get a Pap smear if the examination table cannot be lowered. There are a number of alternative examination procedures that can be used, including knee-chest position, diamond-shaped position, M-shaped position and V-shaped position.These alternative procedures can help accommodate women who have difficulty putting their feet into stirrups or who need greater body support. In addition, OB stirrups can be used for additional comfort. The Welner table, designed by American obstetrician-gynecologist and disability rights activist Sandra Welner, is an examination table designed with a wider range of adjustments and positions to facilitate accessibility for both patients and doctors with physical disabilities. Welner also compiled the handbook, Welner's Guide to the care of women with disabilities. Welner died before the book was finished, Florence Haseltine completed it.

A study conducted in 1989 found that only 19% of women with physical disabilities had been counseled on sexuality in a medical setting and were rarely offered information about contraceptives. Women with ID often lack both education about sexual health and the ability to learn about it informally. In addition, their medical providers are less likely to discuss contraception with them.

Women in Zimbabwe, where people with disabilities are often treated as second-class citizens, face increased barriers in having access to services for sexual health. When the National Reproductive Health Policy was implemented in 2006, women with disabilities were virtually ignored. Zimbabwean women with disabilities faced negative attitudes about their reproductive health, especially from female nurses who expressed the idea that "sex was not meant for the disabled."

Some disabled women have been advised to become sterilized or to have an abortion because doctors feel that they are unsuited or unfit to become mothers. In the United States, a 1927 Supreme Court case, Buck v. Bell, allowed the forced sterilization of women with intellectual disabilities. In Singapore, the Voluntary Sterlisation Act (VSA) was passed in 1970 and which allowed any spouse, parent or guardian of persons who are "afflicted with any hereditary form of illness that is recurrent, mental illness, mental deficiency or epilepsy" to consent to the sterilization on their behalf. In Brazil, many healthcare providers and individuals with disabilities both see sterilization as the only option for contraception.

Maternity care
A 1996 study regarding pregnant women with disability found that more than 50% of hospitals in the United States could not accommodate women with physical disabilities due to accessibility issues.

A study published in the Journal of Applied Research in Intellectual Disabilities demonstrated that pregnant women and mothers with ID benefit from the inclusion of a doula both before and after they gave birth. This approach contrasts with "crisis driven" services that are more often given to parents who have intellectual disabilities. Participants in the small study felt that they gained a trusting relationship with their doulas and that helped them stay calm both during labor and after. The women were able to make better, more informed choices about their own care because of the information and support they received from their doulas. In the Netherlands, women with ID are provided support in order to become successful parents.

In planning for childcare after birth, some doctors overplan and take agency away from women with disability. Healthcare providers plan for people to do jobs for the new mother, rather than assisting the new mother or helping her adapt.

Breast health 
Many women with a disability do not regularly receive or are not regularly referred for breast cancer screenings. Women with some physical disabilities may need to be referred to special mammography centers because most equipment is not designed to accommodate women who are unable to stand. Some women with disabilities do not get breast cancer screening due to financial concerns. Clinical depression is also a complication involved in whether or not women with disabilities get annual mammograms. Women who have had ionizing radiation applied to the spine during health procedures are at an increased risk of developing breast cancer.

Later life
The model of successful aging often includes the problematic (and likely abelist) idea of being free from chronic illness. Limited studies looking at successful aging among people with disability found that they could also age successfully, though in a somewhat different manner than non-disabled individuals. Older women are more likely to be disabled than younger women. The most common disability affecting elderly women worldwide is osteoarthritis. Older women who have disabilities that affect their mobility are at risk of losing contact with their communities and have poor quality of life outcomes.

Women with physical disabilities are at a greater risk of having lower bone mass and are at risk for osteoporosis. Women with ID and Down syndrome often go through menopause at an earlier age than other women. Women with various disabilities sometimes show different symptoms from decreased estrogen levels during menopause.

Loss of estrogen after menopause can also lead to a greater likelihood of urinary incontinence. Treatment and therapy interventions for incontinence have not been tested or modified for women with disabilities.

See also 
 Right to health
 Sexual and reproductive health and rights
 Sexuality and disability

References

Citations

Sources 

Women's health
Disability rights
Sexual health
Right to health